This is a list of species in the fungal genus Scleroderma (order Boletales).

List of species

 Scleroderma albidum Pat. & Trab. (1899)
 Scleroderma arenicola Zeller (1947)
 Scleroderma areolatum Ehrenb. (1818)
 Scleroderma australe Massee (1889)
 Scleroderma bermudense Coker (1939)
 Scleroderma bougheri Trappe, Castellano & Giachini (2000) – Brazil
 Scleroderma bovista Fr. (1829)
 Scleroderma bulla R.Heim (1966)
 Scleroderma cepa Pers. (1801)
 Scleroderma chevalieri Guzmán (1967) – Mexico
 Scleroderma chrysastrum G.W.Martin (1954)
 Scleroderma citrinum Pers. (1801)
 Scleroderma columnare Berk. & Broome (1873)
 Scleroderma congolense Demoulin & Dring (1971)
 Scleroderma cyaneoperidiatum Watling & K.P.Sims (2004) – Malaysia
 Scleroderma dictyosporum Pat. (1896)
 Scleroderma echinatum (Petri) Guzmán (1967)
 Scleroderma echinosporites Rouse (1962)
 Scleroderma endoxanthum Petch (1919)
 Scleroderma flavidum Ellis & Everh. (1885)
 Scleroderma floridanum Guzmán (1967)
 Scleroderma franceschii Macchione (2000)
 Scleroderma furfurellum Zeller (1947)
 Scleroderma hakkodense Kobayasi (1986)
 Scleroderma hypogaeum Zeller (1922)
 Scleroderma laeve Lloyd (1916)
 Scleroderma leptopodium Pat. & Har. (1908)
 Scleroderma lycoperdoides Schwein. (1822)
 Scleroderma mayama Grgur. (1997)
 Scleroderma mcalpinei (Rodway) Castellano (1993)
 Scleroderma meridionale – Demoulin & Malençon (1971)
 Scleroderma michiganense (Guzmán) Guzmán (1970)
 Scleroderma minutisporum Baseia, Alfredo & Cortez (2012)
 Scleroderma multiloculare Dring & Rayss (1964)
 Scleroderma nitidum Berk. (1854)
 Scleroderma pantherinum Mattir. (1931)
 Scleroderma paradoxum G.W.Beaton (1982)
 Scleroderma patagonicum Nouhra & Hern.Caff. (2012) – Argentina
 Scleroderma poltaviense Sosin (1952)
 Scleroderma polyrhizum (J.F.Gmel.) Pers. (1801)
 Scleroderma pseudostipitatum Petch (1919)
 Scleroderma radicans Lloyd (1908)
 Scleroderma reae Guzmán (1967)
 Scleroderma rhodesicum Verwoerd (1926)
 Scleroderma sapidiforme Sosin (1959)
 Scleroderma schmitzii Demoulin & Dring (1971)
 Scleroderma septentrionale Jeppson (1998) – Northern Europe
 Scleroderma sinnamariense Mont. (1840)
 Scleroderma stellenbossiense Verwoerd (1926)
 Scleroderma suthepense Kumla, Suwannarach & Lumyong (2013) – Thailand
 Scleroderma torrendii Bres. (1902)
 Scleroderma tuberoideum Speg. (1906)
 Scleroderma uruguayense (Guzmán) Guzmán (1970)
 Scleroderma verrucosum (Bull.) Pers. (1801)
 Scleroderma xanthochroum Watling & K.P.Sims (2004) – Malaysia
 Scleroderma yunnanense Y.Wang (2013) – China
 Scleroderma zenkeri Henn.

References

Scleroderma
Scleroderma